Antonio Balestra (12 August 1666 – 21 April 1740) was an Italian painter of the Rococo period.

Biography
Born in Verona, he first apprenticed there with Giovanni Zeffio. By 1690 he moved to Venice, where he worked for three years under Antonio Bellucci, then moved to Bologna and then to paint in Carlo Maratta's workshop in Rome. In 1694, he won a prize from the Accademia di San Luca. He later painted both in Verona and Venice; although his influence was stronger in the mainland. His pupils in Verona were Pietro Rotari and Giambettino Cignaroli. In Venice, he painted for the churches of the I Gesuiti and San Zaccaria, and the Scuola della Carita. Pietro Longhi briefly worked under Balestra. In Venice, other pupils or painters he influenced, included Mariotti, Giuseppe Nogari, Mattia Bortoloni and Angelo Trevisani. He also influenced a young Giambattista Pittoni. Among his pupils from Verona were Domenico Pecchio, Domenico Bertini, and Carlo Salis.

In painting, Balestra was staid and reactionary. Wittkower quotes the distaste of Balestra in 1733 for the tendency of then-modern painters to deviate from enshrined standards of academic painting:

He painted a Virgin and Infant, with Saints Ignatius and Stanislaus Kostka for the church of Sant'Ignazio at Bologna. He also painted for churches of Venice, Vicenza, Padua, Brescia, and Verona. In prints, he etched a Head of a Warrior, Virgin Mary and Infant in the Clouds, with Two Soldiers; Vignette, with two figures holding a Flag of Verona,  and a Portrait of an Architect

Works
Trinity, Castelvecchio
La ricchezza della terra, Trento
David and Goliath, Carrara Academy, Bergamo
The Miracle of Saint Nicholas, City Museum, Busseto
The Death of Abel (between 1701 and 1704)
The Holy Family, National Gallery, Prague
Portrait of Doge Alvise III, Duchal Palace, Venice
Adoration of the Magi (1707), Jalinch Collection, Zagreb
The Annunciation, Church of San Tommaso, Verona
Madonna and Saints, Church of Santa Maria in Organo, Verona
A replica is now at the Pinacoteca civica di Forlì
Saint Oswald, Church of San Stae, Venice
Apollo and Midas, Palazzo Pizzini, Rovereto
Santa Giustina (Saint Justine) church, Padua
Adoration of Shepherds
Martyr of Saints Cosmas and Damian (1717-1718)
Theseus Discovering his Father's Sword
Vision of the Virgin, alongside St Joseph, granting the scapular to Blessed Simone Stock (around 1725) San Marco in San Girolamo, Vicenza
San Luigi Gonzaga in preghiera davanti alla Vergine (1745), San Luigi Gonzaga Basilica, Castiglione delle Stiviere
Miracle of St Dominic
Prophet Isaiah
Saint Francis in Ecstasy, Museo de Castelvecchio, Verona
Madonna with Saints Andrew and Gregory (1734), San Gregorio al Celio, Rome
Frescoes at the villa of Alessandro Pompei

Drawings
The Sacrifice of Isaac, sanguine on blue paper, LACMA, Los Angeles County Fund (54 12.7)

Sources
 (Google Books)

Lilli Ghio - Edi Baccheschi, Antonio Balestra, Ed. Bolis, 1989
U. Ruggeri, Nuove opere documentate di Antonio Balestra, in Pittura veneziana dal Quattrocento al Settecento: studi di storia dell'arte in onore di Egidio Martini, a cura di G. M. Pilo, Venezia 1999
G. Fossaluzza, Antonio Arrigoni "pittore in istoria", tra Molinari, Ricci, Balestra e Pittoni, in "Saggi e memorie di storia dell'arte", 21, 1997

References

External links

 Image of the Death of Abel

1666 births
1740 deaths
Painters from Verona
17th-century Italian painters
Italian male painters
18th-century Italian painters
Rococo painters
Italian Baroque painters
18th-century Italian people
Pupils of Carlo Maratta
18th-century Italian male artists